Barbicambarus cornutus is a species of crayfish found only in the Barren River and Green River systems of Tennessee and Kentucky. Although it was first described in 1884, it was not seen again until the 1960s. The species is sometimes called the bottlebrush crayfish.

References

Cambaridae
Fauna of the Eastern United States
Endemic fauna of the United States
Freshwater crustaceans of North America
Crustaceans described in 1884
Taxa named by Walter Faxon